Laura Švilpaitė (born 7 January 1994 in Vilnius, Lithuania) is a Lithuanian artistic gymnast.

Achievements 
 2008 European Junior Championships – 10th
 2009 European Youth Olympic Festival – 4th
 2011 World Championships – 125th
 2012 London Olympic Test Event – qualified to compete as an individual in the 2012 Olympics
 2012 Olympics – 50th

References 

Lithuanian female artistic gymnasts
Living people
1994 births
Sportspeople from Vilnius
Gymnasts at the 2012 Summer Olympics
Olympic gymnasts of Lithuania
Lithuanian gymnastics coaches